Gorakhpur Rural is a constituency of the Uttar Pradesh Legislative Assembly covering the city of Gorakhpur Rural in the Gorakhpur district of Uttar Pradesh, India. It is one of five assembly constituencies in the Gorakhpur Lok Sabha constituency. Since 2008, this assembly constituency is numbered 323 amongst 403 constituencies.

The MLA is Bharatiya Janta Party candidate Bipin Singh who won in the 2022 Uttar Pradesh Legislative Assembly election defeating Samajwadi Party candidate Vijay Bahadur Yadav by a margin of 24,070 votes.

Members of the Legislative Assembly

Election results

2022

2017

References

External links
 

Assembly constituencies of Uttar Pradesh
Politics of Gorakhpur district